Edward, Ed, or Eddie Reed may refer to:

Politics
Edward C. Reed (1793–1883), American politician
Edward Reed (naval architect) (1830–1906), British naval architect and politician
E. Ray Reed (1891–1970), West Virginia politician

Sports
Eddie Reed (1901–1960), American lawyer and college football coach
Eddie Reed (baseball) (1929–2009), American Negro league baseball player
Edward Reed (coach), American water polo coach
Ed Reed (born 1978), American football player

Others
Edward Cornelius Reed Jr. (1924–2013), American federal judge
Edward S. Reed (1954–1997), American ecological psychologist and philosopher
Edward Tennyson Reed (1860–1933), British cartoonist
T. Edward Reed, Canadian zoologist, anthropologist, and pediatrician

See also
Edward Rede (by 1476–1544), English politician
Edward Reid (disambiguation)
Ted Reed (1890–1959), American baseball player